Idmiston Halt railway station served Porton Down military camp in Idmiston, Wiltshire, England, from 1943 to 1968 on the West of England line.

History 
The station was opened on 3 January 1943 by the Southern Railway. It closed on 9 September 1968.

References 

Disused railway stations in Wiltshire
Former Southern Railway (UK) stations
Beeching closures in England
Railway stations in Great Britain opened in 1943
Railway stations in Great Britain closed in 1968
1943 establishments in England
1968 disestablishments in England